"My Oasis" is a song by British singer Sam Smith, featuring vocals from Nigerian singer and songwriter Burna Boy. It was released through Capitol Records on 30 July 2020 as the lead single from Smith's third studio album Love Goes (2020). The song was written by Jimmy Napes, Sam Smith and Burna Boy. Burna Boy's production includes elements of Afrobeats.

Background
The song received its official first play on BBC Radio 1's Annie Mac Show. Talking about the song, Sam Smith said, "This track has been a beautiful release of emotions for me during this time. I've been a fan of Burna Boy for years now and so happy to have a tune with him."

Personnel
Credits adapted from Tidal.
 Ilya – producer, associated performer, keyboards, percussion, programming, vocal producer
 Jimmy Napes – producer, composer, lyricist, associated performer, bass guitar, programming, synthesizer
 Damini Ogulu – composer, lyricist, associated performer, featured artist, vocals
 Sam Smith – composer, lyricist, associated performer, vocals
 Ben Jones – acoustic guitar, associated performer, electric guitar
 Darren Heelis – additional Juno Bass played and recorded
 Randy Merrill – mastering engineer, studio personnel
 Steve Fitzmaurice – mixer, studio personnel

Charts

Release history

References

2020 singles
2020 songs
Sam Smith (singer) songs
Burna Boy songs
Songs written by Sam Smith (singer)
Song recordings produced by Ilya Salmanzadeh
Songs written by Jimmy Napes
Songs written by Burna Boy